A kneeler is a piece of furniture used for resting in a kneeling position.

Kneeler may also refer to:

Kneeling chair, recommended for certain diseases or injuries of the backbone 
Garden kneeler, a kneeler for use during gardening
Kneeling bus, a type of commuter bus that lowers to admit passengers
A motorcycle with a low center of gravity